"All This Is That" is a song  by American rock band the Beach Boys from their 1972 album Carl and the Passions – "So Tough". Written by Al Jardine, Carl Wilson, and Mike Love, the song was inspired by Maharishi Mahesh Yogi's Transcendental Meditation teachings and the Robert Frost poem "The Road Not Taken".

Background
Asked about the song in a 2013 interview, Al Jardine gave the following explanation:

Mike Love said in a 1972 interview,

Critical reception
In his 1978 biography of the Beach Boys, John Tobler wrote that it was unlikely that "All This Is That" (along with the album track "He Come Down") would "figure in anyone's favorite 20 Beach Boys tracks."

Reviewing the band's albums from 1966 to 1973, Record Collectors Jamie Atkins said that "All This Is That" was perhaps "one of the group's greatest achievements without Brian; a fantastically calming song with some of the finest vocal interplay of this period married to an airy melody that perfectly suited the by-now-perennial subject matter of transcendental meditation. And the note that Carl hits on the 'Jai guru dev' lyric has mood-altering qualities that, if it were possible to bottle it, would do wonders if available on prescription."

Personnel
Credits from Craig Slowinski, John Brode, Will Crerar and Joshilyn Hoisington

The Beach Boys
Blondie Chaplin - bass guitar
Ricky Fataar - drums w/ brushes, cabasa
Al Jardine - lead and backing vocals, producer
Mike Love - lead and backing vocals
Carl Wilson - lead and backing vocals, upright piano, Wurlitzer electric piano, Rocksichord, producer

References

1972 songs
The Beach Boys songs
Songs based on poems